Lamont Bryan (born ) is a Jamaica international rugby league footballer who plays for the London Skolars in Betfred League 1.

Background
Bryan was born in Germany to an African-Americans father, and a Jamaican mother. He was brought up in Croydon, and played his junior rugby league with the South London Storm. Bryan also plays rugby union for Streatham-Croydon RFC.

Featherstone Rovers 
In January 2013 Lamont was signed by the Featherstone Rovers. Where he made a total of 24 appearances, scoring 6 tries in just one season for the club.

London Skolars 
Lamont signed a deal to play for the London Skolars in 2014.

In 2015, Bryan played for Jamaica in their 2017 Rugby League World Cup qualifiers.   Just missing out on a finals place.

He began his second spell at Skolars in 2017.

References

External links
London Skolars profile
(archived by web.archive.org) London Broncos profile

1988 births
Living people
Jamaican rugby league players
Jamaica national rugby league team players
English rugby league players
German rugby league players
Jamaican people of American descent
English people of African-American descent
English people of Jamaican descent
German people of African-American descent
German people of Jamaican descent
German emigrants to England
Featherstone Rovers players
Gloucestershire All Golds players
London Broncos players
London Skolars players
People from Croydon
Rugby league centres
Rugby league fullbacks
Rugby league second-rows
Rugby league utility players
Rugby league wingers